Ondrej Zošiak (born December 9, 1990) is a Slovak professional ice hockey defenceman who is currently playing for the Invicta Dynamos in the ENIHL southern division 1.

External links

HKM Zvolen players
Living people
Slovak ice hockey defencemen
1990 births
Competitors at the 2011 Winter Universiade
Expatriate ice hockey players in Poland
Sportspeople from Zvolen
Expatriate ice hockey players in Austria
Expatriate ice hockey players in England
Slovak expatriate ice hockey people
Slovak expatriate sportspeople in Poland
Slovak expatriate sportspeople in Austria
Slovak expatriate sportspeople in England